SIGMA is an electronic verification service offered by Nielsen Media Research and is generally used for commercials, infomercials, video news releases, public service announcements, satellite media tours, and electronic press kits. 

It operates by encoding the SIGMA encoder ID, date of encoding, and time of encoding in lines 20 and 22 of the video signal, which is outside of the area displayed on a normal television screen (this is similar to how closed captioning is transmitted). 

On a professional video monitor with underscan capability activated or a computer display of the entire video frame, the SIGMA data will look like small, moving white lines at the top of the frame. Nielsen provides overnight reports of airplay in all television markets in the country.

Television technology